The 1997 NCAA Division I Tennis Championships were the 51st annual championships to determine the national champions of NCAA Division I men's singles, doubles, and team collegiate tennis in the United States.

Two-time defending champions Stanford defeated Georgia in the championship final, 4–0, to claim the Cardinal's third consecutive and fifteenth overall team national title.

Host sites
The men's tournaments were played at the Los Angeles Tennis Center at the University of California, Los Angeles in Los Angeles, California. 

The men's and women's tournaments would not be held at the same site until 2006.

See also
NCAA Division II Tennis Championships (Men, Women)
NCAA Division III Tennis Championships (Men, Women)

References

External links
List of NCAA Men's Tennis Champions

NCAA Division I tennis championships
NCAA Division I Men's Tennis Championships
NCAA Division I Men's Tennis Championships
NCAA Division I Men's Tennis Championships